"The Knight in White Satin Armor" is the 25th episode of the HBO original series The Sopranos and the 12th of the show's second season. It was written by Robin Green and Mitchell Burgess, and directed by Allen Coulter, and originally aired on April 2, 2000.

Starring
 James Gandolfini as Tony Soprano
 Lorraine Bracco as Dr. Jennifer Melfi
 Edie Falco as Carmela Soprano
 Michael Imperioli as Christopher Moltisanti
 Dominic Chianese as Corrado Soprano, Jr.
 Vincent Pastore as Pussy Bonpensiero
 Steven Van Zandt as Silvio Dante
 Tony Sirico as Paulie Gualtieri*
 Robert Iler as Anthony Soprano, Jr.*
 Jamie-Lynn Sigler as Meadow Soprano
 Drea de Matteo as Adriana La Cerva
 David Proval as Richie Aprile
 Aida Turturro as Janice Soprano
 Nancy Marchand as Livia Soprano
 * = credited only

Guest starring

Synopsis
Pussy turns against Tony, resenting the way he has been treated, and begins to behave like an FBI agent. Christopher and an associate are planning to hijack a shipment of Pokémon cards. Pussy spends the night trailing them and in the morning, sleepy, crashes into another car, injuring his knee and knocking down a cyclist. Skip Lipari gets him out of trouble but angrily rebukes him: his duty is only to collect evidence against Tony Soprano.

Richie is penalized by Tony because he is still selling cocaine on his garbage routes, but for Junior the income from cocaine is his "lifeline". Richie suggests having Tony killed, and says he can muster support from other dissatisfied crews. Junior permits him to raise the matter with capo Albert "Ally Boy" Barese, who is not persuaded. Alone, Junior thinks it over: he calculates that Richie, failing to "sell" the plan to Albert, is not respected; he, Junior, is better off with Tony. He tips Tony off, and Tony starts planning a hit on Richie with Silvio.

Richie and Janice spend a quarrelsome evening at home. She tells him that Tony does not want his children near him because of what he did to Beansie. Richie expresses disgust at the presumed homosexuality of his son, who is a dancer; Janice contradicts him, and he silences her with a punch to the mouth. She goes out of the room, comes back with a gun, shoots Richie once in the chest, and kills him with a second shot. In a panic, she phones Tony, who finds her crying over the body. He calls Chris and Furio to dispose of the body. They dismember it with the meat-cutting equipment at Satriale's.

In the morning, Tony encounters Livia, in whose house Richie and Janice were staying, for the first time since her stroke. Tony explains that Richie has left; Livia smiles at a distraught Janice and says she knew it wouldn't last. The mother and son exchange hurtful recriminations. On his way out, Tony stumbles down the stoop and falls on the front walk, which instantly changes Livia's crying into soft laughter. Janice returns to Seattle.

Carmela contrives a meeting with Victor. She says that one day she might be free and, as she leaves, kisses him lightly on the cheek. Victor is greatly relieved when she has gone.

Loading the washing machine, Carmela smells Irina's perfume on Tony's clothes. But he has had enough of Irina and breaks up with her. In response, Irina attempts suicide with vodka and pills. He goes to the hospital and comforts her. He then sends Silvio with a parting gift of $75,000. Irina's cousin, Svetlana Kirilenko, urges her to accept it.

First appearances
 Jackie Aprile, Jr.: Richie's nephew and son of Rosalie Aprile and the late Jackie Aprile, Sr.
 Albert Barese: Acting capo of the Barese crew while his cousin Larry Boy Barese is under indictment.
 Svetlana Kirilenko: The cousin of Tony's comàre, Irina.

Deceased
 Richie Aprile: shot by Janice after he punched her in the mouth for defending his son being a ballroom dancer.

Title reference
 The episode's title is a quote made by Irina about her cousin Svetlana's American fiancé, Bill, who treats her well. Irina first says this in the season one episode "College". It is a malapropism confusing the set phrase "knight in shining armor" and the Moody Blues song "Nights in White Satin".
 Janice is fitted for a white satin wedding dress; she ironically serves as Tony's savior when she kills Richie.

Cultural references
 Junior mentions Joe Profaci, "old man Profaci knew how to split his enemies", to explain Richie's inability to "sell" the plan to Albert.
 When advising Irina to accept Tony's parting gift of cash, Silvio cites Gail Sheehy's New York Times bestselling book, Passages.
 Tony sarcastically comments that Uncle Junior is a counter-agent like Matt Helm, a fictional character from books, 1960s films, and a 1970s TV series.

Music
 The music being played when Rick and Juliet are ballroom dancing is The Paris Suite Soundtrack from the album Forget Paris.
 The song played over the end credits and during Richie and Janice's engagement party is "I Saved the World Today" (1999) by Eurythmics.
 "The Memory Remains" by Metallica is playing in the background at the Bada Bing.

Filming locations 
Listed in order of first appearance:

 Livingston, New Jersey
 Kearny, New Jersey
 Newark, New Jersey
 Paterson, New Jersey
 Verona, New Jersey
 Satriale's Pork Store in Kearny, New Jersey
 Newark Penn Station

Awards
 Allen Coulter was nominated for the Primetime Emmy Award for Outstanding Directing for a Drama Series for his direction in "The Knight in White Satin Armor." Mitchell Burgess and Robin Green were nominated for Outstanding Writing for a Drama Series and William B. Stich received a nomination for Outstanding Single-Camera Picture Editing for a Drama Series.

References

External links
"The Knight in White Satin Armor"  at HBO

The Sopranos (season 2) episodes
2000 American television episodes
Television episodes directed by Allen Coulter